The Fulde is a river of Lower Saxony, Germany.

It belongs to the Weser river system. It rises in a valley between two parallel end moraines formed in the Saalian Ice Age. From there the Fulde runs through, at times, picturesque scenery between steep, grass-covered, clay banks and fish ponds south of the Walsrode town forest of Eckernworth, where the Rischmannshof Heath Museum is located, crosses the centre of the town through the Fulde Park with its town hall and joins the River Böhme south of the Walsrode Abbey lake.

See also 
List of rivers of Lower Saxony

Literature 
 Topographische Karte 1:25000, Blatt 3123. (Hrsg.: Landesvermessung und Geobasisinformation Niedersachsen), Hannover 2002 (1. Auflage); 

Rivers of Lower Saxony
Heidmark
Rivers of Germany